Onnenpyörä (Finnish for "Wheel of Fortune") is a live cover album by Sielun Veljet under four different aliases, released in 1988.

Track listing 
 Leputation of the Slaves: "It's My Life" (Carl D'Errico, Roger Atkins) -- 3:41
 Pimpline & The Defenites: "Shimmy Shimmy Kokobop" (Bob Smith) -- 2:54
 Kullervo Kivi & Gehenna-yhtye: "Kolmatta linjaa takaisin" (orig. "Beautiful in the Rain) (Tony Hatch, Jackie Trent, Finnish lyrics by Juha Vainio) -- 2:36
 Adolf und die Freie Scheisse: "Springtime for Hitler" (Mel Brooks) -- 2:35
 Leputation of the Slaves: "Speak Up Mambo" (Al Castellanos) -- 3:55
 Kullervo Kivi & Gehenna-yhtye: "Seinillä on korvat" (orig. "Walls Have Ears") (Roy C. Bennett, Sid Tepper, Finnish lyrics by Saukki) -- 2:38
 Leputation of the Slaves: "Riders on the Storm" (Jim Morrison, Robby Krieger, Ray Manzarek, John Densmore) -- 2:38
 Pimpline & The Defenites: "All I Have to Do Is Dream" (Boudleaux Bryant) -- 3:22

Personnel 
 Ismo Alanko -- vocals, guitar
 Jukka Orma—guitar
 Jouko Hohko -- bass
 Alf Forsman -- drums

Notes 

1988 albums
Covers albums
Sielun Veljet albums